Třemošnice is a town in Chrudim District in the Pardubice Region of the Czech Republic. It has about 3,000 inhabitants.

Administrative parts
Villages of Hedvikov, Kubíkovy Duby, Lhůty, Podhradí, Skoranov, Starý Dvůr and Závratec are administrative parts of Třemošnice.

Geography
It lies on the border of the Iron Mountains and Central Elbe Table.

History
The first written mention of Třemošnice is from 1564. A fortress was built in 1610, which was rebuilt into a small castle in 1750. In 1816, an ironworks was established, which led to an increase in the population. In 1882, the railway was built.

Demographics

Sights
The late Baroque Třemošnice Castle is privately owned and its interiors were converted into apartments.

Notable people
Hermann Zwierzina (1825–1873), the first mayor of Ostrava

Gallery

References

External links

Cities and towns in the Czech Republic
Populated places in Chrudim District